Restless Dance Theatre, formerly Restless Dance Company, is a dance theatre company based in the South Australian capital of Adelaide. Founded in 1991, Restless works with people with and without disability.

History 
The Restless Dance Company was founded in 1991 by Sally Chance and Tania Rose and was incorporated in 1996.

The company changed its name to Restless Dance Theatre in 2008.

In April 2020, the company was shocked to hear that they hadn't been included in the 2021-2024 funding round by the Australia Council for the Arts.

Description 
The company presents dance theatre works in multiple mediums to diverse audiences. Restless has an extensive workshop program for all ages.

 the Artistic Director is Michelle Ryan, who has been the Artistic Director since January 2013.

Performances
From 4 September to 2 October 2020, Restless perform "Seeing Through Darkness", inspired by Expressionist artist Georges Rouault, at the Art Gallery of South Australia (AGSA). All of the 15-minute performances were sold out, with only 10 people allowed per performance owing to social distancing restrictions in place because of the COVID-19 pandemic in Australia. AGSA had invited artistic director Michelle Ryan five years earlier, and Ryan chose nine works which focused on the human body and experience, rather than Rouault's religious works. Six dancers were accompanied by an original score by Hilary Kleinig and Emily Tulloch (of the Zephyr Quartet), with lighting designed by Geoff Cobham (artistic director of Patch Theatre) and Meg Wilson.

Awards
The company won the award for Outstanding Achievement in Youth or Community Dance at the 2010 Australian Dance Awards for Bedroom Dancing.

*Special Commendation Ruby Award 2022 - Best Work or Event Within a Festival Guttered 

*Winner Ruby Award - Sustained Contribution by an Organisation 2019

*Winner Ruby Award - Artistic Innovation and Enterprise 2017 Intimate Space

*Winner Adelaide Critics Circle Award - Group Award (Professional Theatre) Intimate Space 

*Nomination Ruby Award – Best Work or Event outside of a Festival Seeing Through Darkness 

*Nomination Helpmann Award - Best Dance Production 2017 Intimate Space

*Nomination Helpmann Award - Best Dance Production 2018 Intimate Space 

*Nomination Ruby Award - Best New Work 2017 Intimate Space

References

External links
 
 

Dance companies in Australia
Contemporary dance companies
Performing arts in Adelaide
1991 establishments in Australia
Physically integrated dance
Disability organisations based in Australia